During the 1999–2000 English football season, Luton Town F.C. competed in the Football League Second Division.

Season summary
Just before the 1999–2000 season, the club was sold to Cliff Bassett, while player sales continued to balance the books. Young duo Kelvin Davis and Chris Willmott were sold to Wimbledon for £900,000, and Lawrence was forced to sell Gary Doherty late on in the season, but he successfully kept an inexperienced Luton side up once again. Mike Watson-Challis then purchased the club in 2000, and Lawrence was sacked to be replaced by former Luton player Ricky Hill.

Final league table

Results
Luton Town's score comes first

Legend

Football League Second Division

FA Cup

League Cup

Football League Trophy

Squad

Left club during season

See also
List of Luton Town F.C. seasons

References

Luton Town F.C. seasons
Luton Town F.C.